Benedetto Geraci (1590–1660) was a Roman Catholic prelate who served as Bishop of Lipari (1650–1660).

Biography
Benedetto Geraci was born in 1590 in Gerace, Italy.
On 19 Dec 1650, he was appointed during the papacy of Pope Innocent X as Bishop of Lipari.
On 8 Jan 1651, he was consecrated bishop by Francesco Peretti di Montalto, Archbishop of Monreale, with Ranuccio Scotti Douglas, Bishop Emeritus of Borgo San Donnino, and Francesco Biglia, Bishop of Pavia, serving as co-consecrators. 
He served as Bishop of Lipari until his death on 18 Aug 1660.

References

External links and additional sources
 (for Chronology of Bishops) 
 (for Chronology of Bishops) 

17th-century Italian Roman Catholic bishops
Bishops appointed by Pope Innocent X
1590 births
1660 deaths